30942 Helicaon  is a Jupiter trojan from the Trojan camp, approximately  in diameter. It was discovered on 8 February 1994, by Belgian astronomer Eric Elst at ESO's La Silla Observatory in northern Chile. The dark Jovian asteroid has a long rotation period of 44.8 hours. It was named after the Trojan warrior Helicaon from Greek mythology.

Orbit and classification 

As all Jupiter trojan, Helicaon is in a 1:1 orbital resonance with Jupiter. It is located in the trailering Trojan camp at the Gas Giant's  Lagrangian point, 60° behind its orbit . It is also a non-family asteroid of the Jovian background population. It orbits the Sun at a distance of 4.8–5.5 AU once every 11 years and 10 months (4,314 days; semi-major axis of 5.19 AU). Its orbit has an eccentricity of 0.07 and an inclination of 23° with respect to the ecliptic.

The body's observation arc begins with its official discovery observation at La Silla in February 1994.

Naming 

This minor planet was named from Greek mythology after the Trojan warrior Helicaon, son of Antenor and King Priam's daughter, Laodice. The official naming citation was published by the Minor Planet Center on 26 July 2010.

Physical characteristics 

Helicaon is an assumed C-type asteroid, while most larger Jupiter trojans are D-types.

Rotation period 

In February 2015, a rotational lightcurve of Helicaon was obtained from photometric observations over at total of 12 nights of photometric observations by Robert Stephens at the Center for Solar System Studies in Landers, California. Lightcurve analysis gave a rotation period of  hours with a brightness amplitude of 0.18 magnitude. While not being a slow rotator, Helicaon has a significantly longer period than most larger Jupiter trojans (see table below).

Diameter and albedo 

According to the survey carried out by the NEOWISE mission of NASA's Wide-field Infrared Survey Explorer, Helicaon measures 32.54 kilometers in diameter and its surface has an albedo of 0.050, while the Collaborative Asteroid Lightcurve Link assumes a standard albedo for a carbonaceous asteroid of 0.057 and calculates a diameter of 30.59 kilometers based on an absolute magnitude of 11.3.

Notes

References

External links 
 Asteroid Lightcurve Database (LCDB), query form (info )
 Dictionary of Minor Planet Names, Google books
 Discovery Circumstances: Numbered Minor Planets (30001)-(35000) – Minor Planet Center
 Asteroid 30942 Helicaon at the Small Bodies Data Ferret
 
 

030942
Discoveries by Eric Walter Elst
Named minor planets
19940208